In Greek mythology, Herse ( "dew") may refer to the following figures:

Herse, daughter of Selene by Zeus, see Ersa.
Herse, daughter of Cecrops.
Herse, one of the many consorts of King Danaus of Libya and mother of his daughters Hippodice and Adiante. These daughters wed and slayed their cousin-husbands, sons of King Aegyptus of Egypt and Hephaestine during their wedding night. According to Hippostratus, Danaus had all of his progeny by a single woman, Europe, daughter of the river-god Nilus. In some accounts, he married his cousin Melia, daughter of Agenor, king of Tyre.

Notes

References 

 Apollodorus, The Library with an English Translation by Sir James George Frazer, F.B.A., F.R.S. in 2 Volumes, Cambridge, MA, Harvard University Press; London, William Heinemann Ltd. 1921. ISBN 0-674-99135-4. Online version at the Perseus Digital Library. Greek text available from the same website.
 Pausanias, Description of Greece with an English Translation by W.H.S. Jones, Litt.D., and H.A. Ormerod, M.A., in 4 Volumes. Cambridge, MA, Harvard University Press; London, William Heinemann Ltd. 1918. . Online version at the Perseus Digital Library
 Pausanias, Graeciae Descriptio. 3 vols. Leipzig, Teubner. 1903.  Greek text available at the Perseus Digital Library.
 Tzetzes, John, Book of Histories, Book VII-VIII translated by Vasiliki Dogani from the original Greek of T. Kiessling's edition of 1826. Online version at theoi.com

Queens in Greek mythology